Changchun (长春镇) is a town in Xiapu County, Fujian.

Located in Fujian Sheng province, in the southeastern part of the country, 1,500 km south of Beijing is the capital of the country. 19 meters above sea level is located in Changchun, and has 43,760 inhabitants. The population consists of 20,134 females and 23,626 males. Children under the age of 15 are 15.0%, adults aged 15-64 73%, and the elderly over 65 11.0%.

The land around Changchun is rather hilly in the south-east, but in the north-west it is flat. To the northwest, the sea is closest to Changchun. The highest point in the vicinity has an elevation of 350 meters and is 2.5 km east of Changchun. There are about 214 people per square kilometer around Changchun relatively sparsely populated. The nearest larger town is Songcheng, 17.5 km north of Changchun. The area around Changchun is almost covered in dust and barrenness. In the region around Changchun, islands are unusually common.

The climate is temperate. The average temperature is 17 ° C. The warmest month is July, at 24 ° C, and the coldest February, at 7 ° C. The average rainfall is 1,950 millimeters per year. The wettest month is June, with 274 millimeters of rain, and the wettest October, with 71 millimeters.

Notes

References 

Township-level divisions of Fujian